Limnaecia conjuncta is a moth in the family Cosmopterigidae. It is found in Mozambique.

References

Natural History Museum Lepidoptera generic names catalog

Endemic fauna of Mozambique
Limnaecia
Moths described in 1921
Taxa named by Edward Meyrick
Moths of Sub-Saharan Africa
Lepidoptera of Mozambique